Hedge accounting is an accountancy practice, the aim of which is to provide an offset to the mark-to-market movement of the derivative in the profit and loss account.  

There are two types of hedge recognized. For a fair value hedge, the offset is achieved either by marking-to-market an asset or a liability which offsets the P&L movement of the derivative.  For a cash flow hedge, some of the derivative volatility is placed into a separate component of the entity's equity called the cash flow hedge reserve. 

Where a hedge relationship is effective (meets the 80%–125% rule), most of the mark-to-market derivative volatility will be offset in the profit and loss account.  Hedge accounting entails much compliance - involving documenting the hedge relationship and both prospectively and retrospectively proving that the hedge relationship is  effective.

Why is hedge accounting necessary?
All entities are exposed to some form of market risk. For example, gold mines are exposed to the price of gold, airlines to the price of jet fuel, borrowers to interest rates, and importers and exporters to exchange
rate risks.

Many financial institutions and corporate businesses (entities) use derivative financial instruments to hedge their exposure to different risks (for example interest rate risk, foreign exchange risk, commodity risk, etc.).

Accounting for derivative financial instruments under International Accounting Standards is covered by IAS39 (Financial Instrument: Recognition and Measurement).

IAS39 requires that all derivatives are marked-to-market with changes in the mark-to-market being taken to the profit and loss account.  For many entities this would result in a significant amount of profit and loss volatility arising from the use of derivatives.

An entity can mitigate the profit and loss effect arising from derivatives used for hedging, through an optional part of IAS39 relating to hedge accounting.

What hedge accounting options are available to an entity that wants to manage foreign currency exposure?

A specific type of hedging transaction that entities can engage in aims to manage foreign currency exposure.  These hedges are undertaken for the economic aim of reducing potential loss from fluctuations in foreign exchange rates. However, not all hedges are designated for special accounting treatment. Accounting standards enable hedge accounting for three different designated forex hedges: 

A cash flow hedge may be designated for a highly probable forecasted transaction, a firm commitment (not recorded on the balance sheet), foreign currency cash flows of a recognized asset or liability, or a forecasted intercompany transaction.
A fair value hedge may be designated for a firm commitment (not recorded) or foreign currency cash flows of a recognized asset or liability.
A net investment hedge may be designated for the net investment in a foreign operation.

See also
 IFRS 9 Financial Instruments (replacement of IAS 39), of the International Accounting Standards Board
 IAS 39 Financial Instruments: Recognition and Measurement, of the International Accounting Standards Board
 Fair value accounting

References

Sources
A summary of the IAS39 by Deloitte Touche Tohmatsu.

External links
IAS 39 summary as provided by Deloitte's IAS Plus website
Basic Fixed Income Derivative Hedging - Article on Financial-edu.com.
Hedge Accounting Journal Entries
 Comparing Hedge Accounting Under GAAP and IFRS 9
Richard Steiman CPA

Types of accounting
Derivatives (finance)